Baron Haden-Guest, of Saling in the County of Essex, is a title in the Peerage of the United Kingdom. It was created on 2 February 1950 for the Labour Party politician Leslie Haden-Guest. He had previously represented Southwark North and Islington North in the House of Commons. His fourth son, the fourth Baron (who succeeded his half-brother in 1987, who in his turn had succeeded his brother in 1974), was a United Nations official for many years.

The title is held by his son Christopher Guest, the fifth Baron, who succeeded him in 1996. Christopher Guest is a film director, writer, actor and musician, married to the actress Jamie Lee Curtis, who is therefore the current Lady Haden-Guest.

Barons Haden-Guest (1950)
Leslie Haden-Guest, 1st Baron Haden-Guest (1877–1960)
Stephen Haden Haden-Guest, 2nd Baron Haden-Guest (1902–1974)
Richard Haden Haden-Guest, 3rd Baron Haden-Guest (1904–1987)
Peter Albert Michael Haden-Guest, 4th Baron Haden-Guest (1913–1996)
Christopher Haden-Guest, 5th Baron Haden-Guest (born 1948)

Anthony Haden-Guest, the current baron's older half-brother, was born out of wedlock, and hence is not in the line of succession.  As the current baron's children, Annie Haden-Guest and Ruby Haden-Guest, are adopted (and thus likewise not in the line of succession), the heir presumptive is the present holder's brother, The Hon. Nicholas Haden-Guest (born 1951). As Nicholas Guest has two daughters, but no male children, there are no more heirs to the barony.

Male-line family tree

Coat of arms
ARMS: Sable two flaunches or, three Welsh triple harps in fess counter-changed.

CREST: A caladrius displayed sable, beaked, legged and charged on the breast with a sun in splendour or.

SUPPORTERS: Dexter, a leopard Sable semée of roundels Or and grasping in the interior paw a quill Or; Sinister, a leopard Or semée of roundels Sable and grasping in the interior paw a quill Sable.

MOTTO: Non nobis solum nati sumus (Not for ourselves alone do we come into the world).

References

 Kidd, Charles; Williamson, David (editors). Debrett's Peerage and Baronetage (1990 edition). New York: St Martin's Press, 1990. 

Baronies in the Peerage of the United Kingdom
Noble titles created in 1950
Noble titles created for UK MPs